The Alcantara is a river in Sicily, southern Italy. It has its source on the south side of Monti Nebrodi and its mouth in the Ionian Sea at Capo Schiso in Giardini-Naxos.

The name Alcantara is of Arabic origin and refers to a bridge from Roman times found by the Arabs. Thucydides called it Akesines Potamos ( - Akesínes) while its Latin names were Assinus, Assinos, Asines, Asinius, Onobala, Onobalas, and Acesines. Cantera was another hydronym for it, adopted by Normans. The river is mentioned by Thucydides on occasion of the attack made on Naxos by the Messenians in 425 BCE.

Course
On its way to the sea, past the north of Mount Etna, it flows through the municipalities of Randazzo, Mojo Alcantara, Francavilla di Sicilia, Motta Camastra, Castiglione di Sicilia, Graniti, Gaggi, Calatabiano, Taormina and Giardini-Naxos.

Several thousand years ago, the river bed was blocked by a lava flow from Mount Etna. As the lava was cooled much more quickly by the water than it would have done otherwise, it crystallised in the form of columns. Over the next millennia, the river naturally eroded a channel through these columns, resulting an impressive gorges and ravines, such as the Alcantara Gorges (Gole dell'Alcantara) next to Francavilla di Sicilia, where the Peloritani mountains end.

Park

The Alcantara River Park (Parco fluviale dell'Alcantara) was established in 2001 for the protection of the river, and to encourage its use as a relaxation area and tourist destination. The columns and surroundings can be seen in the segment "The Enchanted Doe" of the 2015 film Tale of Tales.

Tributaries
Flascio
San Paolo
Favoscuro
Fondachello
Roccella
Petrolo

References

External links
 Alcantara River Park

Rivers of Italy
Rivers of Sicily
Columnar basalts
Rivers of the Province of Catania
Rivers of the Metropolitan City of Messina
Drainage basins of the Ionian Sea